Spring Breakers is a 2012 American comedy crime film written and directed by Harmony Korine and starring James Franco, Vanessa Hudgens, Selena Gomez, Ashley Benson and Rachel Korine. Gomez, Hudgens, Benson and Korine portray four college-aged girls who go on spring break in St. Petersburg, Florida and meet an eccentric local drug dealer (Franco) who helps them in a time of desperation, and their eventual descent into a world of drugs, crime, and violence.

Korine had devised the concept over several years prior to production, with fleeting ideas about the plot and what should transpire. His initial desire was to create a "sensory film" that was more about feeling than action and placed little importance on narrative or plot, the idea for which came later. Once Korine developed the story's backbone, which takes place around the American spring break period, he traveled to Florida to write the screenplay. Production began in 2012, on an estimated budget of $5 million, making it Korine's second most expensive feature film to date. It is also one of Korine's first theatrical works to receive a wide release.

Spring Breakers was released on March 22, 2013 in the United States by A24 and grossed $31 million worldwide, making it a resounding success considering the small budget. It received generally positive reviews from critics, with some calling it a potential cult classic. The film was selected to compete for the Golden Lion at the 69th Venice International Film Festival. Critics and scholars have read deeper meaning in the plot, commenting on its reflection of modern-day superficiality and the younger generation's self-destructive obsession with highly stylized, disposable pop culture media and sensory ephemera. It ranks in BBC's 100 Greatest Films of the 21st Century.

Plot

College students Brit, Candy, and Cotty often spend their time partying while their friend Faith attends a religious youth group. As their classmates head to spring break, they are stuck behind due to a lack of money. Desperate to make the trip, Brit and Candy, after getting high on cocaine, don ski masks and rob a local restaurant using hammers and realistic-looking squirt guns. They are assisted by Cotty, who drives (and later burns) the getaway car stolen from one of their professors. Cotty, Candy, and Brit divulge the details of their crime to a horrified Faith, who keeps quiet about it.

In St. Petersburg, Florida, the girls attend wild beach parties fueled by alcohol, drugs, and sex. After a particularly wild party, all four are arrested for using narcotics. They spend the night in a holding cell, but are bailed out by Alien, a rapper, drug hustler, and arms dealer. Alien charms Cotty, Candy, and Brit with his money and "bad boy" swagger, but Faith is extremely uncomfortable. Alien takes the girls to a local club frequented by gang members, where Faith becomes even more uneasy with his lifestyle. Alien attempts to seduce Faith and convince her to stay with him, using equal parts menace, threats, and tenderness, but Faith leaves, begging the others to come with her. They refuse, and she makes the trip home alone.

Alien takes the remaining girls to a strip club owned by his rival and childhood best friend, Big Arch, who warns Alien to stop selling drugs in his territory. Alien then takes the girls to his mansion, where he flaunts his drug money and cache of weapons, describing his life as the "American Dream". Brit and Candy grab two of his guns and threaten to kill him. Turned on, Alien fellates the gun and declares that he has fallen in love with the girls, claiming that they are his soulmates.

Alien arms the girls with pink ski masks and shotguns, taking them to his pool where the girls ask him to play something inspiring on the piano. So they sing Britney Spears' "Everytime," while a montage plays of them performing several armed robberies. While in Alien's car they are approached by Big Arch and another member of his gang who threaten them and execute a drive-by shooting, wounding Cotty in the process. Alien promises to retaliate, but a traumatized Cotty comes to her senses and chooses to follow in Faith's footsteps, returning home. Brit and Candy stay behind and have three-way sex with Alien in his pool. The three of them decide to take revenge on Big Arch. In a flashforward, the two girls call home, promising to work harder and become better people.

Back in the present, the three travel in a motorboat to Big Arch's mansion. After they dock at the pier, Alien is immediately shot and killed by one of Big Arch's guards. Brit and Candy carry on, killing Big Arch's gang before finally confronting and killing Big Arch himself. During the assault and its aftermath, the camera pans over the dead bodies of Big Arch's gang while the girls speak in a voice-over, first heard earlier in the film, describing the beach's beauty and musing that they have discovered who they truly are. Brit and Candy, silent and wearing pensive, ambiguous expressions, drive home in Big Arch's Lamborghini. A final flashback shows the two girls kissing Alien's dead body before departing.

Cast
 James Franco as Alien, a rapper, drug hustler and arms dealer who takes the girls under his wing.
 Vanessa Hudgens as Candy, an irresponsible and uncaring girl in college and Brit's best friend.
 Selena Gomez as Faith, a girl who tries to devote her life to Christianity but is also friends with party girls Brit, Candy and Cotty.
 Ashley Benson as Brit, a rebellious and danger-seeking college girl, also Candy’s best friend.
 Rachel Korine as Cotty, a promiscuous girl who likes to party but is a little more careful than her friends Candy and Brit.
 Gucci Mane as Archie "Big Arch", Alien's childhood best friend turned rival drug dealer.

Additionally, Heather Morris, Ash Lendzion, and Emma Holzer appear as Faith's friends Bess, Forest and Heather. Jeff Jarrett portrays a youth pastor and Russell Stuart appears as a DJ.

Production

Casting 

According to Harmony Korine, he wrote the film partially to make up for his own spring breaks, as he had been fully devoted to skateboarding, and therefore missed out on what he saw as opportunities for hedonistic pursuits. Korine has referred to the film as a "beach noir".

The original lineup of lead actresses was announced as Emma Roberts, Selena Gomez and Vanessa Hudgens. Director Korine had purposely collected a group of well-known young actresses with a similar reputation to Roberts in Hollywood. Ashley Benson was ultimately cast instead after Roberts dropped out due to her being uncomfortable with the film’s explicit sexuality.

Filming 
The film was shot in March and April 2012 in and around St. Petersburg, Florida. The exterior shots and some interior shots of the college where Gomez and Benson attend were filmed at New College of Florida, while the dormitory and classroom shots were filmed at Ringling College of Art and Design. Korine announced in 2013 he planned to "remix" the film's unused footage and alternate takes into an entirely new cut.

Music 
The film score to Spring Breakers was composed by Cliff Martinez and Skrillex, marking the first scoring assignment for the latter. Skrillex was contacted after Korine sent music supervisor Randall Poster links to the electronica artist's music on YouTube. "I'm accustomed to being the oldest person at a gig," said Poster, "but when I went to see Skrillex at Roseland this year, it was dramatic. There were a lot of kids that looked like they were 15 years old. But I loved it. I truly loved it." Magneto Dayo released the song "Spring Breakers", featuring Sage Odessa, which references the film and real life spring break experiences.

Soundtrack album 

Spring Breakers (Music From the Motion Picture) is a soundtrack album for the film of the same name. It was released on March 19, 2013 by Big Beat Records and Warner Music.

Release
A three-minute preview of Spring Breakers was released at the 2012 Cannes Film Festival in May 2012. The entire film premiered at the 69th Venice International Film Festival on September 4, 2012. The film was released in New York and Los Angeles on March 15, 2013. The film was released nationwide on March 22, 2013. The film had a limited release in the U.K. on April 5, 2013. The movie was also released in France on March 6, 2013 and was scheduled to be released in Australia in early March, however was pushed back to a release date of May 4.

Home media
Spring Breakers was released digitally on June 25, 2013, and on DVD and Blu-ray on July 9, 2013.

Reception

Box office
Spring Breakers grossed $14,124,284 in North America and $17,600,000 in other countries for a worldwide total of $31,724,284. In North America, the film opened to #6 in its first weekend with $4,858,944, behind The Croods, Admission, The Call, Oz the Great and Powerful, and Olympus Has Fallen.

Critical response

On review aggregator Rotten Tomatoes, the film holds an approval rating of 67% based on 195 reviews, with an average rating of 6.5/10. The website's critical consensus reads, "Spring Breakers blends stinging social commentary with bikini cheesecake and a bravura James Franco performance." At Metacritic, which assigns a weighted mean rating from film critics, it received a rating score of 63 out of 100 based on 40 critics, indicating "generally favorable reviews". Xan Brooks of The Guardian said the film is Korine's "most fully realised, purely satisfying feature film since Gummo." Emma Seligman of The Huffington Post described the film as "Scarface meets Britney Spears." Oliver Lyttlelton of IndieWire gave the film a B, stating that the film would be a future cult favorite for "midnight moviegoers".

Guy Lodge of Variety gave it a negative review saying, "this attractively fizzy pic may be a shock to the system for fans of teen queens Selena Gomez and Vanessa Hudgens, but remains pretty toothless titillation by its writer-helmer's standards." David Rooney of The Hollywood Reporter noted that James Franco gives one of his more bizarre performances in his unpredictable career, saying "he's a cross between Bo Derek in 10 and Richard Kiel in Moonraker." Andrew Schenker of Slant Magazine gave the film 3 out of 4 stars. Jamie Dunn of The Skinny gave it 4 out of 5 stars, saying: "If Michael Mann was to take a lot of hallucinogenics and shoot a Girls Gone Wild video, it might look something like this." Richard Roeper gave the film three-and-a-half stars out of four, praising the character of Alien and the film's sense of humor.

A24 began a campaign in September 2013 in support of a Best Supporting Actor Oscar nomination for Franco's performance. This was preceded by the Hollywood.com website that produced a "For your consideration" poster in support of a nomination for Franco in March 2013. On December 2, 2013, A24 published a YouTube video titled "James Franco - Consider this Sh*t" and also released print advertisements following the "Consider this Sh*t [sic]" theme. Originally, Internet chatter considered the campaign a joke, but A24 has since made it clear that the campaign was indeed serious.

Spring Breakers has since appeared on various retrospective "best of" lists, including one honoring the best films of the 21st century. In 2016, British film magazine Little White Lies placed the film at number 40 on their list of the 50 best films of the decade (so far). In August of that same year, BBC Magazine conducted a poll on the 21st century's 100 greatest films so far, with Spring Breakers ranking at number 74. In France, the magazine Les Cahiers du cinéma featured Spring Breakers on their March 2013's cover, and placed it second on their December 2013 Top Ten chart.

Top ten lists
Spring Breakers was listed on many critics' top ten lists for 2013.

 Best of 2013 (not ranked) – Mark Olsen, Los Angeles Times
 2nd – Nigel M. Smith, Gabe Toro, & Katie Walsh, Indiewire
 2nd – Cahiers du cinéma
 4th – Ben Kenigsberg, The A.V. Club
 6th – David Ehrlich, Film.com
 6th – Gregory Ellwood, HitFix
 7th – Drew McWeeny, Hitfix
 8th – Ty Burr, The Boston Globe
 8th – Kristopher Tapley, HitFix
 8th – Marlow Stern, The Daily Beast
 10th – Joshua Rothkopf, Time Out New York
 10th – A.O. Scott, The New York Times
 Best of 2013 (listed alphabetically, not ranked) – Manohla Dargis, The New York Times

Controversies

Riff Raff controversy 
On February 15, 2012, Korine contacted rapper Riff Raff about appearing in an upcoming film of Korine's which would later turn out to be Spring Breakers. Once the trailer was released there was speculation that the character Alien was based on Riff Raff. According to Franco, Alien is based on the underground rap artist Dangeruss, who has a cameo in the film. "Of course Harmony and I looked at some of Riff Raff's videos as inspiration, but he was one of a number of people we looked at. I would say the biggest influence on the role was this local, Florida rapper named Dangeruss. He's fairly unknown, but he was down there in the place, living the life, and he became the biggest model for me, and he's in the movie." After much back-and-forth between both camps about the issue, Riff Raff announced in July 2013 that he was suing the creators of Spring Breakers for $10 million for "sampling" his life without his permission or a proper producer credit. However, a September, 2013 search by LA Weekly for court documents resulted in no findings.

Portrayal of women  
Spring Breakers has generated debate and controversy among critics, with some regarding the film as sexist due to its objectification of women, while others viewed the film as a feminist or female-empowerment film. In regard to the former perspective, The Guardian suggests that the film "reinforces rape culture" and "turns young women into sex objects," while other reviewers state that it "pushes booze-and-bikini hedonism to the extreme," as the "camera glides up, down, and around these women's bodies like a giant tongue". According to Rolling Stone, the film presents "a kind of girl-power camaraderie that could almost be called feminist," a result of the director's intent to "do the most radical work, but put it out in the most commercial way (...) to infiltrate the mainstream". In his review of the film, Richard Roeper wrote "Korine's camera is nearly an intrusive weapon as he lingers over the soft, limber bodies of Vanessa Hudgens, Selena Gomez, Ashley Benson, and his wife, Rachel Korine.... I think that's sort of the point. When a pre-med student on spring break loses her top, drinks to the point of passing out, and grabs a willing lugnut by the ears for six hours of anonymous fun, is she setting the woman's movement back 40 years, or taking charge of her life like any man would do at that age?"

Accolades 
Franco won the Los Angeles Film Critics Association Award for Best Supporting Actor (tied with Jared Leto for Dallas Buyers Club), National Society of Film Critics Award for Best Supporting Actor, and San Francisco Film Critics Circle Award for Best Supporting Actor, while the Washington D.C. Area Film Critics Association nominated him for its Best Supporting Actor award.

Awards

Abandoned sequel

A sequel, under the name of Spring Breakers: The Second Coming, was announced on May 6, 2014, to have been written by Irvine Welsh and directed by Jonas Åkerlund. Welsh's script focused on a set of Spring Breakers coming into conflict with Christian extremists, and Wild Bunch originally slated the film to debut at the upcoming Cannes Film Festival. Upon the announcement, Franco released a statement saying that the sequel was "not being done with Harmony Korine or my consent" and that the producers were "capitalizing on that innovative film to make money on a weak sequel" and attempting to "make money off someone else's creativity".
By 2017, the project had been shelved in favor of a digital series for short-video platform Blackpills; the series never materialized, and Blackpills itself shut down after less than two years online.

References

External links
 
 
 
 

2012 films
2012 independent films
A24 (company) films
Vertigo Films films
Icon Productions films
Annapurna Pictures films
Division Films films
2010s English-language films
Casual sex in films
Films scored by Cliff Martinez
Films about drugs
Films about spring break
Films set on beaches
Films directed by Harmony Korine
Films set in Florida
Films shot in Florida
Film controversies
Obscenity controversies in film
2010s female buddy films
2010s American films